Spain participated in the Junior Eurovision Song Contest 2020 in Warsaw, Poland. Spanish broadcaster RTVE was responsible for the country's participation in the contest, and internally selected the Spanish entrant for the contest.

Background 

Prior to the 2020 contest, Spain had participated in the Junior Eurovision Song Contest on five occasions since its debut in the inaugural  contest. Spain won the  contest with the song "Antes muerta que sencilla", performed by María Isabel. In the  contest, Spain was represented by the song "Marte", performed by Melani García. The song placed 3rd in a field of 19 countries with 212 points.

Before Junior Eurovision 

Spain's participation in the contest was confirmed by RTVE in July 2020. RTVE announced that Soleá had been internally selected to represent Spain on 9 September 2020. In September 2020, RTVE announced that Bruno Valverde, Hajar Sbihi (ASHA) and César G. Ross had composed the Spanish entry. The entry's title, "Palante", and a preview of the song were released to the public on 29 September 2020. The song was released in full on 7 October 2020.

Artist and song information

Soleá 
Soleá Fernández Moreno (born 19 June 2011), better known as Soleá, is a Spanish singer who represented Spain in the Junior Eurovision Song Contest 2020.

Palante 
"Palante" is a song by Spanish singer Soleá, written by Bruno Valverde, Hajar Sbihi (ASHA) and César G. Ross. It represented Spain at the Junior Eurovision Song Contest 2020.

At Junior Eurovision
After the opening ceremony, which took place on 23 November 2020, it was announced that Spain would perform tenth on 29 November 2020, following Russia and preceding Ukraine.

Voting

Detailed voting results
The following members comprised the Spanish jury:
 Emilio Mercadermusic producer
 Jaime Terrónsinger
 Lola Gonzálezchoreographer and artistic director
 Two kids from the music industry

References 

Junior
Countries in the Junior Eurovision Song Contest 2020
Junior Eurovision